Destination NSW is a New South Wales state government executive agency established in 2011 to support growth of tourism and events in New South Wales, Australia. The agency falls within the Enterprise, Investment and Trade cluster of New South Wales government agencies.

Destination NSW run two consumer-facing websites, sydney.com and VisitNSW to promote travel to Sydney and NSW both internationally and domestically.

Governance

Executive 
The agency is managed on a daily basis by an executive team led by Steve Cox, the chief executive officer; and is structured into five divisions:
 Engagement and Development
 People and Culture
 Events
 Finance
 Consumer Marketing

Board of Management 
The Chief Executive Officer reports to a Board of Management that is appointed by the Minister. The Board comprises industry representatives with relevant skills and experience in tourism and events. , the Board comprised the following individuals:
 Christine McLoughlin , Chair
 Russell Balding , Deputy Chair
 Amy Brown
 Steve Cox, chief executive officer
 Rebekah Horne
 Margaret Jack 
 Sally Loane
 Anne Loveridge
 Rod McGeoch 
 The Hon. George Souris

Minister 
The Board of Destination NSW is responsible to the Minister for Tourism presently The Hon. Ben Franklin. Ultimately, the Minister is responsible to the Parliament of New South Wales.

Alliances and sponsorships 
On 23 September 2012 Sydney FC announced it had agreed a sponsorship deal with Destination NSW to promote tourism to Sydney.

Destination NSW is the strategic sponsor of the 2017 World Polo Championship hosted by the Sydney Polo Club. The event will take place in October 2017. It is tournament that will see the world's eight best nations compete for the world title in Sydney's Hawkesbury region.

See also
 "Sydney to Me" by Jess & Matt

References

External links
 Destination NSW - Corporate Site
 Sydney.com - Consumer Site
VisitNSW - Consumer Site

Culture of New South Wales
Government agencies of New South Wales
Tourism organisations in Australia
Tourism in New South Wales

id:Events New South Wales